KC Mitchell (born 1986) is an American powerlifter and former soldier. He is the first amputee to compete for a national powerlifting title.

He was wounded while serving with the U.S Army in Afghanistan in Kandahar province.

On April 3, 2010, he was on a mounted night patrol, when the vehicle he was in struck an explosive device. He sustained extensive injuries that required his left leg to be amputated. He required 44 surgeries as a result of this injuries, he suffered with painkiller addiction, alcoholism and depression during his recovery.

In January 2017, he competed in the USPA American Cup Los Angeles.

Personal records 

 Powerlifting Competition Records

done in official Powerlifting full meets

 Squat – 197.5  kg (435.4 lbs)
 Bench press – 202 kg (446.4 lbs)
 Deadlift – 272.5 kg (600.8 lbs)
 Total – 662.5  kg (1460.5 lbs)

References 

Living people
American strength athletes
American powerlifters
1986 births